Rely may refer to:

 Rely, Pas-de-Calais, a commune (town) in France
 Rely (tampon), a brand of tampon
 Rely (car), a brand of automobiles by Chery

See also 
 Rely Zlatarovic, meteorologist
 Relly, a name (including a list of people with the name)
 Relay (disambiguation)
 Reli (disambiguation)